Alternaria linicola is a fungal plant pathogen.

References

External links

linicola
Fungal plant pathogens and diseases
Fungi described in 1944